Cirroctopus antartica is a species of deep-sea octopus known from only two specimens, both collected around the Antarctic Peninsula. Its shell is like the letter "U" in shape. It is possible, though not certain, that C. antarctica is a synonym of C. glacialis.

References

Molluscs described in 1986
Octopuses